Netsai Mukomberanwa is an acclaimed Zimbabwean sculptor. She is a second generation Shona art sculptor that works with stone as a medium. She spends afternoons producing her work at the family farm in Ruwa; her primary job is as a school teacher.

She is a member of the famed Mukomberanwa family of artists. She is a daughter of first generation Shona art Sculptors Nicholas Mukomberanwa and Grace Mukomberanwa. She is the sister of sculptors Anderson, Ennica, Taguma, Tendai Mukomberanwa and Lawrence Mukomberanwa, and the cousin of Nesbert Mukomberanwa.

From her early childhood on, she was exposed to the art of stone sculpting due to her famous father, Nicholas. Since then she always proved her talent in this discipline, even though it remained a playful hobby for a long time

Awards
Young Women Sculpture Awards - Merit Award 2004
Harare Visual Arts Sector steering committee Member

References

External links
Biography, with examples of her work

Living people
People from Mashonaland East Province
Zimbabwean educators
Zimbabwean women sculptors
20th-century Zimbabwean women artists
21st-century Zimbabwean women artists
Year of birth missing (living people)
20th-century Zimbabwean sculptors
21st-century Zimbabwean sculptors
Women stone carvers